Eilema laurenconi is a moth of the subfamily Arctiinae. It was described by Hervé de Toulgoët in 1976. It is found on Madagascar.

References

laurenconi
Moths described in 1976